Geoff Gamble may refer to:

 Geoffrey Gamble (born 1942), American linguist
 Geoff Gamble (referee) (born 1977), Canadian soccer referee